Daylight is an English-language  documentary photography magazine founded in 2003 by Taj Forer and Michael Itkoff and published by the Daylight Community Arts Foundation. Released quarterly, each issue features a series of selected photographs related to the issue's theme with explanatory essays written by the photographers. The magazine is progressive in outlook and portrays the effects of larger forces and trends on individuals, communities and landscapes. The magazine is headquartered in Chapel Hill, North Carolina.

Since 2010 Daylight has focused on its book publishing program as well as publishing long form features online.

Published issues

Daylight Multimedia
Daylight Multimedia publishes free monthly video podcasts featuring portfolios and narration from contemporary photographers. Podcasts have included Jeff Rich: Watershed, Christopher Sims: Guantanamo Bay, John Duncan: Bonfires, Joshua Lutz: Meadowlands, Joseph Johnson: Megachurches, and Darren Hauck: Elections in Guatemala.

References

External links
 "Daylight Podcast", free downloadable podcast
 "Photographs by Iraqi Civilians, 2004", exhibit at the Center for Photography, Woodstock, NY
 "Photographs by Iraqi Civilians project, Pixel Press"

Visual arts magazines published in the United States
Quarterly magazines published in the United States
Magazines established in 2003
Photojournalistic magazines
Photography in the United States
Magazines published in North Carolina
Mass media in Chapel Hill-Carrboro, North Carolina